Independent Presbyterian Church may refer to:

 Independent Presbyterian Church (Birmingham, Alabama)
 Independent Presbyterian Church of Brazil
 Independent Presbyterian Church in Kenya
 Independent Presbyterian Church (Savannah, Georgia)
 Independent Presbyterian Church of Myanmar
 Independent Presbyterian Church in Angola
 Independent Presbyterian Church in Mexico
 Independent Presbyterian Church (Memphis, Tennessee)